The 2008 1000 km of Spa was the third round of the 2008 Le Mans Series season.  It took place at the Circuit de Spa-Francorchamps, Belgium, on 11 May 2008.

This race marked the first international victory for Canadian Jacques Villeneuve since the Formula One Luxembourg Grand Prix in 1997.

Race results
Class winners in bold.  Cars failing to complete 70% of their Class winner's distance marked as Not Classified (NC).

Both the #17 Pescarolo and #33 Speedy Sebah entries failed to complete the final lap of the race.  Both cars were therefore not classified in the final results even though they had covered sufficient distance.

Statistics
 Pole Position – #8 Team Peugeot Total – 1:58.069
 Fastest Lap – #7 Team Peugeot Total – 1:59.883
 Average Speed – 189.062 km/h

References

External links

 Le mans Series — 1000 km of Spa

Spa
6 Hours of Spa-Francorchamps
1000km